Calosoma oceanicum is a species of ground beetle in the subfamily of Carabinae. It was described by Perroud & Montrouzier in 1864.

References

oceanicum
Beetles described in 1864